Dublin South-Central is a parliamentary constituency represented in Dáil Éireann, the lower house of the Irish parliament or Oireachtas. The constituency elects 4 deputies (Teachtaí Dála, commonly known as TDs) on the system of proportional representation by means of the single transferable vote (PR-STV).

Constituency profile
The constituency comprises Ballyfermot, Bluebell, Crumlin, Drimnagh, Dolphin's Barn, the Liberties, Chapelizod, Walkinstown and parts of Terenure on the fringes. The largest employers in the area are the Guinness Brewery and St. James's Hospital. Dubbed the "People's republic of Dublin South-Central, the constituency is one of the country's most left-wing, with all of the TDs from centre-left or left-wing parties. Both Labour Party TDs elected in 2011 had previously been members of other left-wing parties: Eric Byrne was a former member of the Workers' Party and Democratic Left, and Michael Conaghan had stood in a number of elections for Jim Kemmy's Democratic Socialist Party.

History and boundaries
A constituency of this name was created by the Electoral (Amendment) Act 1947 based the Mansion House, Merchants' Quay, Royal Exchange, St. Kevin's, South Dock, Usher's and Wood Quay wards of Dublin. Its boundaries changed considerably over the years, generally moving to the west within the city.

Under the Electoral (Amendment) Act 2005, which took effect at the 2007 general election, the constituency boundary was extended to the north side of the River Liffey, taking in Islandbridge. It is now located near the centre of Dublin city, and also contains part of South Dublin. The constituency comprises Harold's Cross west, Drimnagh, Walkinstown, Crumlin, Inchicore, Ballyfermot and Kimmage.

The Electoral (Amendment) (Dáil Constituencies) Act 2017 defines the constituency as:

TDs

Elections

2020 general election

2016 general election

2011 general election

2007 general election

2002 general election

1999 by-election
Following the death of Labour Party TD Pat Upton, a by-election was held on 27 October 1999, when turnout was only 27.9%, down from 60% at the 1997 general election. The seat was narrowly won by the Labour Party candidate Mary Upton, sister of the deceased TD.

1997 general election

1994 by-election
Following the resignation of Fianna Fáil TD John O'Connell, a by-election was held on 9 June 1994. The seat was won by the Democratic Left candidate Eric Byrne.

1992 general election

1989 general election

1987 general election

November 1982 general election
John O'Connell was Ceann Comhairle at the dissolution of the 23rd Dáil and therefore deemed to be returned automatically. The constituency was treated as a four-seater for the purposes of calculating the quota.

February 1982 general election
John O'Connell was Ceann Comhairle at the dissolution of the 22nd Dáil and therefore deemed to be returned automatically. The constituency was treated as a four-seater for the purposes of calculating the quota.

1981 general election

1977 general election

1973 general election

1969 general election

1965 general election

1961 general election

1958 by-election
Following the resignation of Independent TD Jack Murphy, a by-election was held on 25 June 1958. The seat was won by the Fianna Fáil candidate Patrick Cummins.

1957 general election

1954 general election

1951 general election

1948 general election

See also
Dáil constituencies
Elections in the Republic of Ireland
Politics of the Republic of Ireland
List of Dáil by-elections
List of political parties in the Republic of Ireland

References

External links
 Oireachtas Constituency Dashboards
 Oireachtas Members Database
 Government of Ireland: Constituency Maps (Current)
 Dublin Historic Maps: Parliamentary & Dail Constituencies 1780–1969 (a work in progress.)
 Dublin Historic Maps: Some Dublin and Kingstown Wards, Between 1780 and 1954

Dáil constituencies
Parliamentary constituencies in County Dublin
1948 establishments in Ireland
Constituencies established in 1948
Politics of Dublin (city)
Politics of South Dublin (county)